Neil Hein (born 7 June 1963) is a former Australian rules footballer who played with the Brisbane Bears in the Victorian Football League (VFL).

Hein played in a South Australian National Football League (SANFL) premiership for Norwood in 1984 and played 140 SANFL game with the club during the 1980s. It was from there that he was signed by Brisbane, who secured his services by using a pre-draft selection prior to the 1987 VFL season.

Hein had the distinction of playing in Brisbane's first ever match, against North Melbourne, which they won by 33 points. From his four disposals he kicked two goals to be one of six multiple goal-kickers for the Bears. A ruckman, Hein did not always play in his preferred position due to the presence of Mark Mickan in 1987 and spent a lot of time up forward during his eight appearances that season. He played seven further games in 1988, some of them as first ruckman.

References

1963 births
Australian rules footballers from South Australia
Brisbane Bears players
Norwood Football Club players
Living people